Muskoday 99A is an Indian reserve of the Muskoday First Nation in Saskatchewan.

References

Indian reserves in Saskatchewan
Division No. 15, Saskatchewan